Synchiropus monacanthus, the deep-water dragonet, is a species of fish in the family Callionymidae, the dragonets. It is found in the Western Indian Ocean and Southeast Atlantic Ocean from Zanzibar, Tanzania to Port Alfred, South Africa.

References

monacanthus
Fish of the Pacific Ocean
Taxa named by J. L. B. Smith
Fish described in 1935